The International Socialist Workers Congress in Zürich that met from 6 to 13 August 1893 was the third congress of the Second International. The congress passed the "Zurich resolution" which expelled anarchists from the congress. On 12 August, Friedrich Engels was designated the honorary president for the day and delivered the closing address, the only time that Engels addressed a Second International period congress. Notable participants included an official delegation from the British trade union movement, led by John Hodge.

Resolutions 
Before deliberations could begin, the Congress voted to exclude the anarchists led by Gustav Landauer, who left in protest. Engels later emphasised the need to remain separate from the anarchists in his closing speech. The mandate of Rosa Luxemburg as a delegate of the Socialists of Poland and Lithuania, in opposition to the Polish Social Democratic Party, was also rejected.

Delegations

References

Bibliography 
Braunthal, Julius. History of the International, Volume 1: 1864–1914.
Haupt, Georges. La Deuxième Internationale, 1889–1914: étude critique des sources, essai bibliographique.

External links 
"The Times" newsclippings of the 1893 International Socialist congress

Second International
1893 conferences